Empress Zhang (221 – 264), personal name unknown, was the last empress of the state of Shu Han in the Three Kingdoms period. She was a daughter of the Shu general Zhang Fei and Lady Xiahou, and was also a younger sister of Empress Jing'ai. In 237, she became an Imperial Consort (貴人) of the Shu emperor Liu Shan. She became empress in February 238, succeeding her elder sister, who had died in the previous year.

Life 
Empress Zhang's father was the famous general Zhang Fei and her mother was a niece of Xiahou Yuan from the rival state of Cao Wei. She was the sister of Empress Jing'ai and Zhang Bao. She was brought to the harem in 237 as an honourable lady; in February 238, with Liu Shan making arrangements within the family including declaring his heir, she succeeded her late sister, with Xiang Lang sent to bestow the seal of office.

In 249, following Sima Yi's coup d'etat against Cao Shuang, a fellow regent of Cao Wei, Sima Yi recalled Xiahou Ba and famed relative Xiahou Xuan to the capital while sending Ba's rival Guo Huai to become commander in the west. While Xiahou Xuan accepted the orders, Xiahou Ba fled to Shu-Han despite his father's death fighting Shu-Han. With Ba badly injured in Hanzhong, Liu Shan sought to smooth potential tensions by pointing to a son (unclear which one) of Xiahou maternal blood to show they were kin and treated Xiahou Ba generously.

In 264,  after Shu Han was conquered by the rival state of Cao Wei, Empress Zhang accompanied Liu Shan and her entire family to the Wei capital Luoyang.

In popular culture

Empress Zhang is first introduced as a playable character in the fifth instalment of Koei's Dynasty Warriors video game series. She was omitted from 6, but was reintroduced in 7 and has been present since. She is given the fictional name "Xingcai" (星彩) in the games. Although there is no mention of her sister throughout the series, the Scholar Quiz of Dynasty Warriors 7 confirms that Xingcai is the second empress of Liu Shan.

See also
 Shu Han family trees
 Lists of people of the Three Kingdoms

References

 Chen, Shou (3rd century). Records of the Three Kingdoms (Sanguozhi).
 Pei, Songzhi (5th century). Annotations to Records of the Three Kingdoms (Sanguozhi zhu).
 Robert Joe Cutter and William Gordon Crowell. Empresses and Consorts: Selections from Chen Shou's Records of the Three States with Pei Songzhi's Commentary. Honolulu: University of Hawai'i Press, 1999.

|-

Shu Han empresses